Boreostemma is an extinct genus of glyptodonts from northern South America. Fossils assigned to the genus were first described as belonging to Asterostemma from southern South America, but have been placed in the new genus Boreostemma by Carlini et al. in 2008. The type species is B. pliocena. Fossils of Boreostemma have been found in the Honda Group of Colombia, in Peru and Venezuela.

Etymology 
The genus name Boreostemma is a combination of stemma, taken from Asterostemma, and boreo is derived from borealis, meaning "northern", to distinguish the northern South American genus from the southern Asterostemma.

Species 

Four species have been described in the genus Boreostemma. Unspecified Boreostemma fossils were found in the Ipururo Formation of the department of Ucayali, Amazonian Peru. Asterostemma contains the type species A. depressa and several nomina dubia. The genus has been found in the Early Miocene (Santacrucian in the SALMA classification) Santa Cruz Formation of the province of Santa Cruz, Argentina and in the Solimões Formation in the state of Acre, Amazonian Brazil.

B. pliocena
The type species B. pliocena was described in 2008 by Carlini et al. based on 30 osteoderms palate fragment with M6-7 alveoli. Fossils have been described from the type locality along the road to Tío Gregorio in the Codore Formation at the Lagerstätte of Urumaco.

B. gigantea
B. gigantea was described as Asterostemma gigantea in 1997 by Carlini et al. based on a partial skeleton. Fossils have been recovered at the Duke Localities 32, 108, 113, 114 and 121W in the La Victoria Formation of the Honda Group at the Konzentrat-Lagerstätte La Venta.

B. acostae
B. acostae was described as Asterostemma acostae in 1983 by Carlos Villarroel based on a carapace fragment with 44 plates. Fossils have been found in the Cerbatana Member, and the Chunchullo Sandstone of the La Victoria Formation, of the Honda Group at the Konzentrat-Lagerstätte La Venta.

B. venezolensis
B. venezolensis was described as Asterostemma venezolensis in 1947 by George Gaylord Simpson, based on most of the carapace and the anterior end of the lower jaw, including teeth. Fossils have been uncovered from the Santa Inés Formation along the banks of the Güere River in the state of Anzoátegui in Venezuela.

Gallery

See also 

 List of fossiliferous stratigraphic units in Colombia
 Glyptodon

References

Bibliography 

 
 
 
 
 

Prehistoric cingulates
Miocene xenarthrans
Miocene mammals of South America
Laventan
Montehermosan
Neogene Colombia
Fossils of Colombia
Honda Group, Colombia
Neogene Peru
Fossils of Peru
Neogene Venezuela
Fossils of Venezuela
Fossil taxa described in 2008